Victoria has some of the best wind resources in Australia, along the southern coast and in the higher altitude areas. Most of Victoria's wind farms are being built along the southern coast and around the Ballarat, Ararat, and Hamilton areas.

The total capacity for the state as of 2021 was around 2,888.3 MW. Several wind farms are under construction while several more have been proposed and approved. The total potential capacity of wind turbines in Victoria including those currently operational, those under construction, and approved proposals is around 8,000 MW. By comparison, Victoria's total peak electricity usage is around 8,000–10,000 MW.

Wind farms in Victoria
This is a list of wind farms in Victoria, Australia with a generating capacity of more than 4 MW

Summary of Victoria-wide total production in MW

See also

Energy in Victoria
List of power stations in Victoria
Wind power in Australia
Renewable energy commercialization

References

External links

 Wind farms in Victoria: Wind in the Bush
Photographs of Victorian Wind Farms: Wind in the Bush
 Yes2Renewables: wind energy in Victoria (including Google map of proposed and existing projects)
 Victorian Department of Environment, Land, Water & Planning - Wind Projects
 Under construction wind farms in Victoria, Australia
 Operational wind farms in Victoria, Australia

Victoria (Australia)
Wind Farms